Glyn Hughes is the name of:
 Glyn Hughes (footballer) (1931-1995), Welsh footballer
 Hugh Llewellyn Glyn Hughes (1892-1973), British military officer in the Royal Army Medical Corps
 Glyn Tegai Hughes (1923 – 2017), Welsh scholar, writer and literary critic
Glyn Hughes (writer) (1935-2011), English poet, artist and novelist
 Glyn Hughes (rugby union) (active 2015), rugby player transferring from Wasps to Moseley in 2015–16
 Glyn Hughes (sculptor) (active 2001), sculptor of the Alan Turing Memorial in Manchester, England